Krasnoslobodsky District (Ošeń ajmak; , Jaksterekuro buje) is an administrative and municipal district (raion), one of the twenty-two in the Republic of Mordovia, Russia. It is located in the center of the republic. Its administrative center is the town of Krasnoslobodsk. As of the 2010 Census, the total population of the district was 26,406, with the population of Krasnoslobodsk accounting for 38.4% of that number.

Administrative and municipal status
Within the framework of administrative divisions, Krasnoslobodsky District is one of the twenty-two in the republic. It is divided into one town of district significance (Krasnoslobodsk) and sixteen selsoviets, all of which comprise seventy rural localities. As a municipal division, the district is incorporated as Krasnoslobodsky Municipal District. The town of district significance of Krasnoslobodsk is incorporated into an urban settlement, and the sixteen selsoviets are incorporated into sixteen rural settlements within the municipal district. The town of Krasnoslobodsk serves as the administrative center of both the administrative and municipal district.

Notable residents 

Alexander Palm (1822–1885), poet, novelist and playwright born in Krasnoslobodsk
Vladimir Volkov (born 1954), politician born in Novoye Arakcheyevo

References

Notes

Sources



 
Districts of Mordovia